Chbika is a small coastal town and rural commune in Tan-Tan Province of the Guelmim-Oued Noun region of Morocco. It is located just to the south of the Port of Tan-Tan, west of the city. At the time of the 2004 census, the commune had a total population of 541 people living in 108 households.
There is a project for a high-end marina covering 40,000 square metres, resorts and Chbika Golf. In January 2016, only a pier for marina was done, but none building.

References

External links
Official site

Populated places in Tan-Tan Province
Rural communes of Guelmim-Oued Noun
Resorts in Morocco